2016–17 Vijay Hazare Trophy was the 15th season of the Vijay Hazare Trophy, a List A cricket tournament in India. It was contested by the 28 domestic cricket teams of India. Tamil Nadu won the tournament, beating Bengal by 37 runs in the final.

Teams

Points table

Group A

Group B

Group C

Group D

Knockout stage

Quarterfinals

Semifinals

Final

References

External links
 Series home at ESPNCricinfo

Vijay Hazare Trophy
Vijay Hazare Trophy
Vijay Hazare Trophy